AIDS-related lymphoma describes lymphomas occurring in patients with acquired immunodeficiency syndrome (AIDS).

A lymphoma is a type of cancer arising from lymphoid cells. In AIDS, the incidences of non-Hodgkin's lymphoma, primary cerebral lymphoma and Hodgkin's disease are all increased. There are three different varieties of AIDS-related lymphoma: Diffuse large B-cell lymphoma, B-cell immunoblastic lymphoma, and Burkitt's lymphoma (small non-cleaved cell lymphoma).

Symptoms and signs
The symptoms of AIDS-related lymphoma can include: weight loss, fever, and night sweats.

Non-Hodgkin's lymphoma
Non-Hodgkin's lymphoma (NHL) is present in about 1%–3% of HIV seropositive people at the time of the initial diagnosis of HIV. However, it is believed that such patients have been seropositive for a prolonged period, but have simply not had their infections recognized previously. This is so because immunodysregulation must exist for an extended interval of time, in order for a lymphoproliferative process to evolve in that context.

Primary cerebral lymphoma
Primary cerebral lymphoma (or primary central nervous system lymphoma) is a form of NHL. It is very rare in immunocompetent people, with an incidence of 5–30 cases per million person-years. However the incidence in immunocompromised individuals is greatly increased, up to 100 per million person-years.

Primary cerebral lymphoma is strongly associated with Epstein–Barr virus (EBV). The presence of EBV DNA in cerebrospinal fluid is highly suggestive of primary cerebral lymphoma.

Treatment of AIDS patients with antiretroviral drugs reduces the incidence of primary cerebral lymphoma.

Hodgkin's disease
The incidence of Hodgkin's disease in the general population is about 10–30 per million person-years. This increases to 170 per million person-years in HIV positive patients.

References

External links 

 Office of HIV and AIDS Malignancy in the National Cancer Institute 
 Information on AIDS-related cancers from the National Cancer Institute

HIV/AIDS
Lymphoma